Old Ironsides station is a light rail station in Santa Clara, California operated by the Santa Clara Valley Transportation Authority (VTA) as part of the VTA Light Rail system. Old Ironsides is served by the Orange Line and is the northern terminal of the Green Line. Immediately west of the station site is a pocket track and double crossover, allowing Green Line trains to switch between tracks and enabling the storage of three, 3-car trains to mobilize trains quickly after the end of an event at Levi's Stadium.

Old Ironsides station is closed for up to 60 minutes after the events at the nearby Levi's Stadium to prevent crowds from overwhelming the station. VTA's Great America station (which is located closer to the stadium) has additional facilities to handle large crowds.

Service

Station layout

References

External links 

Santa Clara Valley Transportation Authority light rail stations
Railway stations in the United States opened in 1987
1987 establishments in California